Ministry of Internal Security may refer to:

 Ministry of Internal Security (Malaysia)
 Ministry of Internal Security (Rwanda)
 Ministry of Internal Security (Somalia)